Szombathelyi KKA is a Hungarian women's handball club. They currently play in the Nemzeti Bajnokság I/B. Until 2022 they played in the Nemzeti Bajnokság I (NBI), the top level championship in Hungary, after gained promotion in 2019.

Since they are sponsored by Hungast Zrt., the official name for the team is Hungast Szombathelyi KKA.

Kits

Honours

Domestic competitions 
Nemzeti Bajnokság I/B:

 : 2018–2019

Team

Current squad 
Squad for the 2022–23 season

Goalkeepers
 1  Judit Balog
 16  Dalma Eleonóra Christe
 42  Noémi Fritz
Wingers 
LW
 19  Zsófia Kiskartali
 28  Petra Balogh
RW
 21  Horváth Anna
 18  Nikolett Varga
Line players
 22  Barbara Szendrei

Back players  
Left back
 3  Dorina Bíró
 20  Apollónia Szmolek
Centre backs
 6  Rebeka Pődör
 11  Blanka Pődör
Right backs
 33  Katarina Tanaskovic

Transfers 

 Transfers for the 2022-23 season

 Joining
  Nikolett Varga (RW) (from  Kozármisleny)
  Dorottya Kulcsár (from  Szent István SE)
  Zsófia Kiskartali (LW)
  Petra Balogh (LW) (from  Váci NKSE)
  Noémi Fritz (GK) (from  Tempo)
  Elena Livrinikj (LB) (from  CSM Deva)
  Milica Raicevic (LB) (from  ZORK Jagodina)

 Leaving
  Zea Kadlicsek (RW) (to  Kisvárdai KC)
  Petra Horváth (LB) (to  Dunaújvárosi Kohász KA)
  Luca Szekerczés (RB) (to  Moyra-Budaörs Handball)
  Fanni Csire (LW) (to  Mosonmagyaróvári KC SE)
  Noémi Virág (PM) (retired)
  Sára Zsákovics (LB) (to  Szent István SE)
  Lilia Gorilska (LP) (to  Moyra-Budaörs Handball)
  Katarina Stošić (LB) (to  Alba Fehérvár KC)
  Katarina Tomašević (GK)
  Cristina Gheorghe (RB)

Staff members 

  Chairman: Zoltán Pődör
 Professional director: Mihály Gódor
  Head Coach: Zoltán Pődör
 Fitness Coach: Tamás Vincze
 Masseur: Máté Tóth

Notable former players 
  Dijana Jovetić
 Biljana Bandelier
 Ivana Mitrovic
  Flóra Sipeki
 Adrienn Orbán
 Szabina Mayer

Coaches 

  György Marosán (2019–2022)
  Zoltán Pődör (2022–present)

References

External links
  
 

Hungarian handball clubs
Sport in Szombathely